David Andrew Rankin (born 2 August 1987) is an Irish cricketer. He made his Twenty20 International (T20I) debut for Ireland against Scotland on 18 June 2015. He is the brother of Boyd Rankin.

He made his List A debut for North West Warriors in the 2017 Inter-Provincial Cup on 1 May 2017. He made his first-class debut for North West Warriors in the 2017 Inter-Provincial Championship on 30 May 2017. He was the leading run-scorer for North West Warriors in the 2018 Inter-Provincial Trophy tournament, with 159 runs in six matches.

References

External links
 

1987 births
Living people
Irish cricketers
Ireland Twenty20 International cricketers
North West Warriors cricketers
Sportspeople from Derry (city)
Cricketers from Northern Ireland